Naomh Olaf is a Gaelic Athletic Association club which was founded in 1981 to provide facilities for encouraging the sporting abilities of the people of the developing parish of Balally in south County Dublin, Ireland. A club house was built and players were recruited from around the area, most of them coming from the local schools of St Olaf's, Gaelscoil Thaobh na Coille, St Benildus College, and St Tiernan's. In recent years more and more players are coming from the Leopardstown and Stepaside areas.

Location 
The club is located on the Sandyford Industrial Estate in Dublin and recruits players from all around the Sandyford and Balally area, including Wedgewood and The Gallops all the way up to Stepaside. In 1999 Dundrum-Churchtown joined forces with Naomh Olaf to serves both Dundrum and Churchtown areas. The club now has 9 schools in their area stretching from Churchtown right up to Stepaside.

Recent achievements 
Football:  
The Club won promotion back to Division 2 in 2016, winning the promotion playoff after just missing out on automatic promotion. The club won the Dublin Intermediate Championship in 2013 and went on to represent Dublin before losing in a thrilling Leinster Intermediate Club Football Championship Semi-Final replay. The Junior team won Division 9 in 2016 and now football teams compete in AFL2, AFL5 and AFL9.

Hurling:  
The club's two adult hurling teams playing in AHL3 and AHL6 and the 1st team competed in the Intermediate hurling championship.

Ladies Football:  
After a long absence the club fielded an adult ladies team again in 2012 after the successful launch of the G4M initiative. A core of the G4M's transferred to a full adult team competing in the lower end of the leagues but have quickly progressed and took a championship in 2012, a cup and league double in 2013, and cup honours in 2014 and 2015. The team will compete in Div 4 in 2020.

Camogie:  
In 2015, the club fielded an adult Camogie team for the first time ever, and finished the season with a Championship to show for their efforts. The club also has over 100 juvenile camogie players so the future looks bright.

Roll of Honour
 Dublin Intermediate Football Championship: Winners 1993, 2013
 Ladies Junior C Football Championship: Winners 2020
 Dublin Junior Football Championship: Winners 1990
 Dublin Junior B Football Championship: Winners 2002
 Dublin Junior All County 2 Championship: Winners 2020
 Dublin Junior D Football Championship: Winners 2016
 Dublin Senior Football League Division 1 Winners 2000
 Dublin Senior Football League Division 2 Winners 2017
 Dublin AFL Division 6 Playoff Winners 2019
 Dublin AFL Division 7 Winners 2018
 Dublin AFL Division 8 Winner 2017
 Dublin AFL Division 9 Winner 2016
 Dublin AFL Division 10 Winners 2019
 Dublin AFL Division 11S Winner 2017

Facilities 
As well as its sporting facilities, the club owns and operates a bar, a function room, and a large hall for training and other events. The club has three senior pitches and a floodlit all weather hurling wall. There is also a Naomh Olaf club shop, which is open every Saturdays from 10.30 -12.

Players 
 David Byrne, Captain of the Dublin Minor football All-Ireland winning team 2012, Dublin U21 Leinster Winning Captain 2015, Dublin All Ireland Winner 2015 & 2016, National League Winner 2016
 Declan O'Dwyer, Former Dublin Senior Hurler, Leinster Championship Winner
 Luke Fitzgerald, former Irish and Leinster rugby union player
 Niamh Donnelly, Dublin Girls U16 All Ireland Finalist 2013
 Clara O'Sullivan, Dublin Girls U16 Leinster Winning Captain 2015, Dublin Minor 2016

External links 
Official Naomh Olaf GAA Website
Dublin Club GAA

Gaelic games clubs in Dún Laoghaire–Rathdown
Gaelic football clubs in Dún Laoghaire–Rathdown
Hurling clubs in Dún Laoghaire–Rathdown
Sandyford